Au Fung-Chi (1847-1914), was a Hong Kong Protestant church leader. He was an Elder of 
To Tsai Church (道濟會堂), which was Sun Yat-sen's place of worship  while he studied medicine in Hong Kong.  Au was Sun's teacher of Chinese literature, and gave Sun the pseudonym name Yìxiān.  Au was also the Secretary of the Department of Chinese Affairs.

See also 
 Names of Sun Yat-sen
 Christianity in Hong Kong

References

1847 births
1914 deaths
Hong Kong Protestants